Oakland Airport most commonly refers to:
Oakland International Airport (IATA: OAK), Oakland, California
 Oakland International Airport station, rapid transit station at the airport
Oakland Airport may also refer to:
Oakland County International Airport (IATA: PTK), Waterford Township, Michigan
Oakland Southwest Airport (FAA: Y47), Oakland County, Michigan
Oakland-Troy Airport (IATA: VLL), Troy, Michigan